The 1972 Rugby League World Cup group stage was the main component of the 1972 Rugby League World Cup, with the top two nations qualifying for the World Cup Final. The group consisted of hosts France as well as Australia, Great Britain and New Zealand.

Ladder

Matches

France vs New Zealand

France kicked off the tournament by sharing six tries with the Kiwis but a massive penalty count in their favour allowed the French to dictate play, their five goals and a drop goal to none by the Kiwis proving decisive.

Great Britain vs Australia

At Perpignan a monumental struggle finally went Britain's way 27–21 against the Kangaroos, for whom Bob Fulton grabbed three tries in a lost cause.

France vs Great Britain

Great Britain overcame France 13–4 to qualify for the final with outstanding second-rower Phil Lowe scoring two tries.

Australia vs New Zealand

New Zealand gave Australia a hard time, the first half being scoreless, before going down 9–5.

Great Britain vs New Zealand

Great Britain hammered New Zealand 53–19, a World Cup record score, with young stand-off John Holmes collecting 26 points (10 goals, 2 tries) – another World Cup record.

France vs Australia

Australia had to beat France at Toulouse to reach the final in the last game of the preliminaries, a task which proved well within their capabilities.

References